The  is a museum located in Tennōji Park, Tennōji-ku, Osaka, Japan. The museum focuses on Japanese and east Asian art.

Collection

Access
Osaka Municipal Subway
Midosuji Line, Tanimachi Line: Tennoji Station
JR West
Yamatoji Line, Osaka Loop Line, Hanwa Line: Tennoji Station
Kintetsu
Minami Osaka Line: Osaka Abenobashi Station

Notes

External links 
Official Web site
Osaka City Museum of Fine Arts within Google Arts & Culture

Art museums established in 1936
1936 establishments in Japan
Art museums and galleries in Osaka